Anthony Garofoli (1936–2003) worked for the City of Cleveland, was an attorney, a politician of the Democratic Party in Cleveland, Ohio.  Garofoli was born in Pittsburgh, Pennsylvania, but came to Cleveland to study at John Carroll University.  He served on Cleveland City Council representing the Little Italy neighborhood of Cleveland.

References
 Carl B. Stokes and the Rise of Black Political Power by Leonard N. Moore 

1936 births
2003 deaths
Cleveland City Council members
John Carroll University alumni
20th-century American politicians